Comic Frontier, also widely known as Comifuro (abbreviated as CF) is a dōjinshi convention held bi-annually in Jakarta, Indonesia.

History 

The convention was founded by several students from the University of Indonesia, with the first convention held in 2012. It was then called Comic Frontier Akipa x Gelar Jepang and 35 circles participated.

Originally a part of Gelar Jepang, a Japanese cultural event organised by Japanese Language Study Centre of University of Indonesia, Comifuro was spun-off as a standalone event since its third convention.

Comifuro is a member of the International Otaku Expo Association, a global association of expos and events that feature otaku culture.

Profile

Comifuro has a wide range of activities and participants, from the dōjin marketplace, cosplay show, corporate booth, music performance, and talkshow discussing creative industries (particularly comic and animation) in Indonesia. The convention has been influenced in design and spirit by the Japanese Comiket convention.

The dōjin marketplace is filled by circles of aspiring or established creators publishing their works independently, covering a wide range of fandoms from the east, west, or local IPs. The cosplay show is another mainstay of the event, with many cosplayers from Indonesia and abroad participating. Stage music performances are usually held during and at the climax of the event, consisting of karaoke sessions, music instrument performances, anison, and DJ performances.

Local comic publishers such as reON and CIAYO and the like would usually hold portfolio review sessions where aspiring writers and/or comic artists may submit their manuscripts.

Comifuro is typically held on Saturday and Sunday, bi-annually each year. Ticket sales began in the morning before the gate opens, traditionally at 9:30, with the ticket gate closing at 17:00. The dōjin marketplace and other activities are open until closing at 18:00.

In response to the COVID-19 outbreak in Indonesia, Comifuro held a new online format for the convention beginning from 2021, aptly named as Comic Frontier Virtual, or Comivuro for short (also often abbreviated as CV or CFV). The online format of the convention is a separate event series from its offline counterpart, with the 15th event reserved for an offline format.

For the first offline Comifuro since COVID-19, CF15, it was moved to hall 9 and 10 of ICE BSD where hall 9 was used as an eating place and hall 10 for the actual event. It attracted 17,000 visitors on the first day, crossing over 20,000 for both days combined. Because of this, many were queueing for hours to get a ticket with others were waiting since 3 am. It also was the first time Good Smile Company sold at Comifuro.

On December 1, 2022, Comic Frontier announced Comifuro 16 on their Twitter to be held on 11-12 March, 2023 in halls 8, 9 and 10 of ICE BSD. It has been delayed to 6-7 May, 2023 however, citing security concerns surrounding the venue and its adjacent areas during the event date as cause of delay.

Events

Notes

References

External links

 

Anime conventions
Comics conventions
Doujin
Otaku
Recurring events established in 2012